The Journal of Electrical Bioimpedance is an open access scientific journal that was established in 2010 and is published by the Oslo Bioimpedance Group with assistance of the University of Oslo Library. The editor-in-chief is Ørjan G. Martinsen (University of Oslo). The journal publishes reviews, articles, and educational material covering research on all aspects of bioimpedance. It is abstracted and indexed in Scopus and PubMed Central.

References

External links

Oslo Bioimpedance Group

Biophysics journals
University of Oslo
Publications established in 2010
English-language journals
Continuous journals
Creative Commons Attribution-licensed journals